Voice over Frame Relay (VoFR) is a protocol to transfer voice over Frame Relay networks.  VoFR uses two sub-protocols, FRF.11 and FRF.12. FRF.11 defines the frame format of VoFR, and FRF.12 is used for packet fragmentation and reassembly.

References

Telephone services
Network protocols
Digital audio
Frame Relay